The 2014 USA Sevens Collegiate Rugby Championship was a rugby sevens tournament. The tournament was held on May 30 — June 1 at PPL Park in Chester, Pennsylvania. It was the fifth annual Collegiate Rugby Championship, and the fourth consecutive year that the tournament is held at PPL Park. California defeated Kutztown 24-21 in the final to secure the CRC Championship for the second year in a row.

Pool stage

Pool A

Pool B

Pool C

Pool D

Pool E

Knockout stage

Shield

Bowl

Plate

Cup

References

2014
2014 rugby union tournaments for clubs
2014 in American rugby union
2014 rugby sevens competitions